Kilmarnock West and Crosshouse  is one of the nine electoral wards of East Ayrshire Council. Created in 2007, the ward elects four councillors using the single transferable vote electoral system and covers an area with a population of 17,739 people.

The area is a Scottish National Party (SNP) stronghold with the party holding half the seats at every election since the creation of the ward.

Boundaries
The ward was created following the Fourth Statutory Reviews of Electoral Arrangements ahead of the 2007 Scottish local elections. As a result of the Local Governance (Scotland) Act 2004, local elections in Scotland would use the single transferable vote electoral system from 2007 onwards so Kilmarnock West and Crosshouse was formed from an amalgamation of several previous first-past-the-post wards. It contains all of the former Crosshouse, Gatehead and Knockentiber, Kilmarnock Central West and Grange and Howard wards as well as parts of the former Altonhill, Hillhead and Longpark, Kilmarnock Central East, Kilmarnock Central South, North New Farm Loch and Dean and Riccarton wards. Kilmarnock West and Crosshouse includes the westernmost part of the council area between its borders with North Ayrshire and South Ayrshire and takes in the towns of Crosshouse, Gatehead and Knockentiber as well as the neighbourhoods of Hillhead, Bonnyton, Grange and Howard in Kilmarnock. Following the Fifth Statutory Reviews of Electoral Arrangements ahead of the 2017 Scottish local elections, the ward's boundaries were not changed.

Councillors

Election results

2022 election

2017 election

2012 election

2007 election

References

Wards of East Ayrshire
Politics of Kilmarnock